Mary Gabriel may refer to:

Mary Gabriel Martyn (1604–1672), Abbess of the Poor Clares of Galway
Virginia Gabriel (Mary Ann Virginia Gabriel, 1825–1877), English composer
Muriel Barron (1904–1988), known as Sister Mary Gabriel, New Zealand nun and pharmacist
Mary Gabriel (author), American author